National Cycle Network (NCN) Route 648 is a Sustrans National Route that connects Bakewell to Sherwood Forest.

Route
Route 648 will connect Route 680 near Bakewell to Route 6 at Sherwood Forest. As of 2018, the only 5 miles between Shirebrook railway station and Route 6 is open. The route is a mixture of traffic free sections and roadside cycle paths.

Route 648 meets the following routes:
 6 at Sherwood Forest

References

External links

Route 648 on the Sustrans web site
Route 648 on OSM

Cycleways in England
National Cycle Routes
Sherwood Forest
Transport in Nottinghamshire